Robert Marchand (26 November 1911 – 22 May 2021) was a French centenarian cyclist. He was the holder of the world record for cycling 100 km and for the distance cycled in one hour, in both the 100–104 and over-105 years old age categories.

Early life
Marchand was born in Amiens, near what was to later become the front line of World War I.

Marchand was a firefighter in Paris in the 1930s. He took an active part during the strikes of 1936 in France which gave birth to the modern era of French employment legislation. He was a prisoner-of-war during World War II. After liberation he moved to Venezuela, where he was a lorry driver and sugarcane planter. In the 1950s he went to Canada, where he had a job as a lumberjack. He returned to France in 1960 and worked as a gardener and wine dealer until 1987.

He was a member of the French Communist Party and the CGT Trade Union, the longest-serving living member, with 90 years of membership. At the time of his death he was one of the oldest remaining World War II veterans.

Cycling career
He returned to cycling in 1978 and continued training after his 100th birthday.

On 4 January 2017, he set a world record in one-hour track cycling in the over-105 age group, covering  in one hour, and the 105 year old centenarian declared: "I could have done better, if I had seen the 10-minute warning card, otherwise I would have pedalled slightly faster".

At the age of 105 he was recognised as the world's oldest competitive cyclist by Guinness World Records.

Marchand put his remarkable fitness and longevity down to a diet consisting of: lots of fruit and vegetables, a little meat, not too much coffee – and an hour a day on the cycling home-trainer.

After he turned 106 Marchand's doctors advised him to stop competing for world records. He obliged, but refused to quit racing completely. In early February 2018 Marchand completed a 4,000-meter race in the same stadium where he made his last record.

Marchand celebrated his 107th birthday by going for a 20-kilometre bike ride in the Ardèche.

After his 108th birthday Marchand stopped riding bikes outdoors due to hearing loss.

Death 
Marchand died on 22 May 2021 at the age of 109.

References

External links

 New York Times: Lessons on Aging Well From a 105 Year Old Cyclist
 YouTube: Cyclist Robert Marchand retires from sport at 106 years of age

1911 births
2021 deaths
French centenarians
French male cyclists
Men centenarians
Sportspeople from Amiens
French deaf people
Deaf sportspeople
French military personnel of World War II
French Communist Party members
French prisoners of war in World War II
Cyclists from Hauts-de-France